Switchboard, formerly Brighton & Hove LGBT Switchboard, is a British listening service or hotline, for the LGBT communities based in Brighton. It service was launched, with just one telephone, in April 1975 at the Open Cafe, a centre for alternative politics, at 7 Victoria Road. It was started by four men and two women and was initially known as The Lavender Line.

It receives over 5,000 calls a year and its website handles 80,000 visitors per year.

See also 
Gay & Lesbian Switchboard of New York
London Friend
Oxford Friend
Switchboard (UK)

References

External links
Brighton Lesbian & Gay Switchboard
Brighton Gay Switchboard 1979, Cripes Restaurant, Victoria Road, Brighton

Brighton and Hove
LGBT organisations in England